Banamex v. Narco News, 2001 603429/00, was a New York Supreme Court case that extended the findings of New York Times Co. v. Sullivan, that freedom of the press applied to an online newspaper's reporting.

The court found that: "Narco News, its website, and the writers who post information, are entitled to all the First Amendment protections accorded a newspaper-magazine or journalist... Furthermore, the nature of the articles printed on the website and Mr. Giordano's statements at Columbia University constitute matters of public concern because the information disseminated relates to the drug trade and its affect on people living in this hemisphere..."

Background
Narco News published a series of articles relating to the operation of Banamex, one of the largest banks in Mexico, and revealed a pattern of illegal and narcotics-related activity by those at the bank.  Banamex filed suit charging that they "have maliciously smeared Banamex with accusations that, among other things, it is controlled and operated by narcotics traffickers and has engaged in illegal activity."

See also
Banamex
Narco News
Al Giordano
New York Times Co. v. Sullivan

External links
 Documents relating to Banamex v. Narco News
 Text of the decision

References

United States Free Speech Clause case law
New York Supreme Court cases
2001 in United States case law
2001 in New York (state)